The Louisville Blades were a minor league professional ice hockey team that played in the International Hockey League during the 1948–49 season, and the United States Hockey League during the 1949–50 season. The Blades were based in Louisville, Kentucky and played at the Louisville Gardens.

Season-by-season results

See also
 Sports in Louisville, Kentucky

External links
 1948-49 statistics
 1949-50 statistics

 
International Hockey League (1945–2001) teams
Defunct ice hockey teams in the United States
Ice hockey clubs established in 1948
Ice hockey clubs disestablished in 1950
1948 establishments in Kentucky
1950 disestablishments in Kentucky
Ice hockey teams in Kentucky